Sears, Roebuck and Company Department Store or
Sears Roebuck and Company Mail Order Store or
Sears, Roebuck & Company Mail Order Building or
Sears, Roebuck and Company Warehouse Building or variations may refer to:

in the United States (by state then city)
Sears, Roebuck & Company Mail Order Building (Los Angeles, California), listed on the NRHP in Boyle Heights, Los Angeles, California
Sears-Pico, Sears store at Pico and Rimpau, Mid-City, Los Angeles 1930s–1990s
Sears, Roebuck and Company Department Store (Miami, Florida), listed on the NRHP in Miami-Dade County, Florida
Sears, Roebuck and Company Complex, Chicago, Illinois, listed on the NRHP in Chicago, Illinois
Sears Merchandise Building Tower, Chicago, Illinois, listed on the NRHP in Chicago, Illinois
McCurdy Building (Sears, Roebuck and Company Building), Evansville, Indiana, listed on the NRHP in Vanderburgh County, Indiana
Sears, Roebuck and Company Store (Louisville, Kentucky), listed on the NRHP in Jefferson County, Kentucky
Sears Roebuck and Company Mail Order Store (Boston, Massachusetts), also known as Landmark Center, listed on the NRHP in Boston, Massachusetts
Sears, Roebuck and Company Mail-Order Warehouse and Retail Store, Minneapolis, Minnesota, listed on the NRHP in Hennepin County, Minnesota
Sears, Roebuck and Company Warehouse Building (North Kansas City, Missouri), listed on the NRHP in Clay County, Missouri
Sears, Roebuck and Company Retail Department Store-Camden, Camden City, New Jersey, listed on the NRHP in Camden County, New Jersey
Starbucks Center, Seattle, Washington, formerly Sears, Roebuck & Co store and warehouse
Sears, Roebuck Department Store (Spokane, Washington), listed on the NRHP in Spokane County, Washington
Sears, Roebuck and Company Department Store (Washington, D.C.), listed on the NRHP in Northwest Quadrant, Washington, D.C.

Sears Holdings buildings and structures